Ferdinand Maack (1861–1930) was a German doctor, inventor and occultist. He invented Raumschach, the classic 3D chess game, first described by him in the Frankfurter Zeitung in 1907. He promoted the game with demonstrations, articles, specialist magazines and several books. He founded the Hamburg Raumschach Club in 1919, which remained active until World War II.

Notes

References

Bibliography

External links
 

1861 births
1930 deaths
Chess variant inventors
20th-century German inventors
20th-century German physicians